This is a list of openly LGBT Americans who are or were judges, magistrate judges, court commissioners, or administrative law judges in the United States and its federal district and territories. If known, it will be listed if a judge has served on multiple courts.

United States court of appeals

United States district courts

Specialty courts (Article I)

State supreme courts

Territorial supreme courts

Other courts

See also 

 List of LGBT state supreme court justices in the United States

Other topics of interest 

 List of African-American jurists
 List of Asian American jurists
 List of Hispanic/Latino American jurists
 List of Jewish American jurists
 List of LGBT state supreme court justices in the United States
 List of Native American jurists
 List of first women lawyers and judges in the United States
 List of first minority male lawyers and judges in the United States

References 

 
 LGBT
Lists of American LGBT people